Krupnik (Крупник) is a village in Simitli Municipality, in Blagoevgrad Province, in southwestern Bulgaria in the Kresna Gorge.It is located at the western part of Maleshevskata mountain.

Population

References

Villages in Blagoevgrad Province